Richard Bland I (August 11, 1665 – April 1720), sometimes known as Richard Bland of Jordan's Point, was a Virginia planter and member of the Virginia House of Burgesses, and the father of Richard Bland,

Early and family life
The son of Theodorick Bland of Westover, and his wife Anna Bennett, the daughter of Governor Richard Bennett., Bland was born into the First Families of Virginia. His maternal grandfather Richard Bennett was the first elected Governor of the Colony of Virginia, during the English Commonwealth period. His brothers were the surveyor Theodorick Bland and John Bland, who was the great-grandfather of Chancellor Theodorick Bland of Maryland.

Bland married Mary Swan and had seven children, who all died as infants. After his first wife died in September, 1700, the widower remarried on February 11, 1701/02, to Elizabeth Randolph, the daughter of William Randolph, who bore five children before she too predeceased Bland:
Mary Bland (born August 21, 1704), oldest daughter, married Henry Lee I and had four children, including Henry Lee II who was the father of Henry "Light-Horse Harry" Lee III and the grandfather of Robert E. Lee.
Elizabeth Bland (born May 29, 1706), 2nd born daughter, married Colonel William Beverley, the son of Robert Beverley Jr., and had four children. The Beverleys were indirect lineal descendants of Pocahontas through their marriage to The Randolphs. 
Anna Bland (born circa 1708), 3rd born daughter, married twice. She had three children with her first husband, Robert Munford, and had two children with her second husband, George Currie.
Theodorick Bland (born 2 December 1718), youngest son, married Frances Bolling, the daughter of Drury Bolling, and had five children, including Congressman Theodorick Bland.
Richard Bland (born May 6, 1710), oldest son and heir, married Anne Poythress and had twelve children. According to Lyon Gardiner Tyler, his second marriage was to Martha Macon and his third marriage was to Elizabeth Blair.

Bland's many notable descendants, in addition to his son and namesake, include Roger Atkinson Pryor and Joseph Pembroke Thom, a Speaker of the Maryland House of Delegates.

Career
Bland operated plantations using enslaved labor. He was also a county commissioner of Charles City County and later Prince George County, a member of the founding Board of Visitors of The College of William & Mary, and is noted in the church records as a member of the Vestry of Bruton Parish Church in Williamsburg, Virginia, which authorized in 1710 the building of the present Church structure.

When his father died in 1671, Bland's elder brother, Theodorick inherited Westover Plantation and legally joined Richard in its ownership. The brothers eventually conveyed 1,200 acres of the Westover Plantation lands in Charles City County to William Byrd I in 1688 for £300 and 10,000 pounds of tobacco and cask. Richard Bland then established the Jordan's Point Plantation across the James River in Prince George County, where he died in 1720.

Death and legacy
Preceding her husband in death, Elizabeth Randolph Bland died January, 1720.

Ancestry

Notes

References

External links

1665 births
1720 deaths
Richard
County supervisors in Virginia
House of Burgesses members
People from Prince George County, Virginia
College of William & Mary people